The Le Mans Cup, previously the GT3 Le Mans Cup and currently known as the Michelin Le Mans Cup under sponsorship, is an international sports car racing endurance series inspired by the 24 Hours of Le Mans race and organized by the Automobile Club de l'Ouest (ACO).

The GT3 Le Mans Cup was created in 2016 after the GTC category was dropped from the European Le Mans Series. The new tournament was designed primarily to increase the number of amateur drivers. The teams' champion automatically receives an invitation to take part in the following 24 Hours of Le Mans in the LMGTE Am category.

From the 2017 season, the series adopted a new format with LMP3 and GT3-class cars competing in their respective categories, with the ACO aiming to create a secondary division of LMP3-racing and promoting the best teams from the Le Mans Cup to the European Le Mans Series.

A new LMP3 specification with higher power engines was introduced for the 2020 season; this was found to consume more fuel than predicted, forcing pit stop and stint time rule changes.

The Le Mans weekend originally had a one-hour format in 2017, and has had two 55-minute races every year since 2018. The remaining races originally had a two-hour format, later shortened to 1h 50min for the 2022 season, to enable removal of this second mandatory pit stop.

Champions

LMP3 Drivers

LMP3 Teams

GT3 Drivers

GT3 Teams

See also
 European Le Mans Series
 World Sportscar Championship

References

External links

Official ACO website

European Le Mans Series
Sports car racing series
Recurring sporting events established in 2016
Group GT3